The Wiz Live! is an American television special that aired live on NBC on December 3, 2015. Produced by Craig Zadan and Neil Meron, it is a performance of a new adaptation of the 1975 Broadway musical The Wiz, a soul/R&B reinterpretation of L. Frank Baum's 1900 novel The Wonderful Wizard of Oz. The broadcast is performed live from Grumman Studios in Bethpage, New York. This adaptation of the musical combines aspects of both the Broadway play and its 1978 film adaptation.

Cast and characters

Main
 Shanice Williams as Dorothy Gale
 Elijah Kelley as the Scarecrow / Sticks the Farmhand Man #3
 Ne-Yo as the Tin-Man / John the Farmhand Man #1
 David Alan Grier as the Cowardly Lion / Robert the Farmhand Man #2
 Mary J. Blige as Evillene, the Wicked Witch of the West
 Queen Latifah as the Wiz
 Amber Riley as Addaperle, the Good Witch of the North
 Uzo Aduba as Glinda, the Good Witch of the South
 Stephanie Mills as Auntie Em / Emily Gale
 Common as The Bouncer / The Gatekeeper of the Entrance to the Emerald City
 Scooter the Dog as Toto

Ensemble

Chris Borrero
James Brown III
Olutayo Bosede
Elon Van Buckley
Ta'rea Campbell
Jessica Castro
Kacie Garland
Asmeret Ghebremichael
Frankie Gordils
Khadija Griffith
Tre Holloway
Carlos Irizarry
Marcus Paul James
Frederic Jean
Capathia Jenkins
Mykal Kilgore
Tamika Lawrence
India R. McGee
Paul McGinnis
Maurice Murphy
Antonio Moore
Danielle Polanco
Malaiyka Reid
Eric Sanchez
Sherisse Springer
Chris Silcox
Ahmahd Thomas
Raphael Thomas
Alex Wade
Donald Webber
DaShaun Wesley
Xavier Wilcher
NaTasha Williams

Pit voices were provided by Broadway Inspirational Voices.

Source: Broadway World

Musical numbers
The list of musical numbers is taken from the actual broadcast and are in order as they appear in the broadcast and include the characters' names who perform the song.

"The Feeling We Once Had" – Aunt Em and Ensemble
"Tornado" – Company
"He's the Wizard" – Addaperle, Dorothy, and Munchkins
"Soon as I Get Home" – Dorothy
"You Can't Win" – Scarecrow and Crows
"Ease on Down the Road" – Dorothy and Scarecrow
"Slide Some Oil to Me" – Tin Man
"Ease on Down the Road (Reprise)" – Dorothy, Scarecrow and Tin Man
"(I'm a) Mean Ole Lion" – Lion
"Ease on Down the Road (Reprise 2)" – Dorothy, Scarecrow, Tin Man and Lion
"Kalidah Battle" – Company
"Be a Lion" – Dorothy and Lion
"Lion's Dream" – Lion and Poppies

"Emerald City Ballet (Psst)" – Company
"So You Wanted to Meet the Wizard" – Wizard
"What Would I Do If I Could Feel" – Tin Man
"We Got It" – Dorothy, Scarecrow, Tin Man and Lion
"Don't Nobody Bring Me No Bad News" – Evilene and Winkies
"Funky Monkeys" – Company
"Everybody Rejoice/A Brand New Day" – The Company
"Y'all Got It!" – Wizard and Company
"Believe in Yourself" – Glinda
"Home/Finale" – Dorothy

All numbers composed by Charlie Smalls save for the following: "Tornado" is composed by Timothy Graphenreed and Harold Wheeler. "Emerald City Ballet (Psst)" is composed by Graphenreed and George Faison. "We Got It" is written by Ne-Yo, Elijah Kelley, Harvey Mason Jr, and Stephen Oremus. "Everybody Rejoice/A Brand New Day" is written by Luther Vandross.

Production

Development
The production, a co-production between Universal Television and Cirque du Soleil Theatrical – who provided special acrobatic performers for the "Tornado", "You Can't Win", and "Funky Monkeys" sequences – was a follow-up to NBC's live musical events, The Sound of Music Live! and Peter Pan Live!. Like the previous specials, The Wiz Live! was televised from Grumman Studios in Bethpage, New York. The role of Dorothy was cast via an open audition on June 6, 2015. On August 5, it was announced on Today that Shanice Williams of New Jersey would fill the role in The Wiz Live!. Williams had co-starred in local productions of You're a Good Man, Charlie Brown and West Side Story among others, and in 2014, was nominated for a Paper Mill Playhouse Rising Star Award for best leading actress.

The special was directed by Kenny Leon and adapted for television by Harvey Fierstein from the original musical's book by William F. Brown. Fatima Robinson was the program's choreographer, with Harvey Mason, Jr. and Stephen Oremus serving as the musical directors. Songs from the original Broadway production were featured, with two exceptions: "You Can't Win", a song cut from the musical and first used in its 1978 feature film adaptation as sung by Michael Jackson, was used in place of the Scarecrow's key number "I Was Born on the Day Before Yesterday", and "We Got It", a new song composed by Harvey Mason Jr., Stephen Oremus with stars Ne-Yo and Elijah Kelley, was performed as Dorothy, the Scarecrow, the Tin Man, and the Cowardly Lion began their journey to find and kill the Wicked Witch of the West.

The Wiz Live! was the first live TV program in US history to contain audio description for blind or visually impaired viewers.

Marketing
The cost of a 30-second commercial during The Wiz ranged between $330,000 to $350,000, marking a drop from the $345,000 to $400,000 cost of ad time during Peter Pan Live!. The decrease in ad cost was attributed to the modest viewership of Peter Pan in comparison to The Sound of Music Live!, which an analyst felt was a result of the reduced novelty of the production in comparison to The Sound of Music. Reddi-wip served as a main sponsor of the presentation; Walmart, which served as a major sponsor of NBC's previous live musicals, declined to participate. NBC produced themed commercials to air throughout the special as part of the brand's "Share the Joy" campaign; one, which was timed to air after the corresponding scene in the musical, featured "A Brand New Day" being performed by students of the Excel Academy in Hyattsville, Maryland—a school which ConAgra Foods had donated money to in support of musical arts.

Reception

Critical reception
The Wiz Live! received positive reviews from critics, who praised the acting and singing abilities of the cast and for being an improvement over the two previous live NBC musicals. On Rotten Tomatoes, the show has a 91% rating, based on 33 reviews, with an average rating of 8.8/10. The site's consensus states: "The Wiz Live! is several notches above NBC's other musical broadcasts thanks to bold performances and large-scale production pieces." Metacritic reports a weighted average of 73 out of 100, based on 16 critics, indicating "generally favorable reviews."

Viewership
The Wiz Live! was seen by 11.5 million viewers, with a 3.4 rating in the 18-49 demographic. Although higher than Peter Pan Live!, it trailed a Thursday Night Football game on CBS between the Detroit Lions and Green Bay Packers, which was seen by around 17 million. Average household viewership was notably higher in markets with a large African-American population, such as Atlanta, Baltimore, Norfolk, Richmond, and Washington, D.C. Nielsen also reported that the special produced the most social network interactions of any live television event in the past four years; there were three times as many Twitter postings related to The Wiz Live! than there were related to Peter Pan Live!. NBC rebroadcast the special on December 19, 2015. The rebroadcast was seen by 1.6 million viewers.

Accolades

Home media
NBC released a DVD of the special on December 22, 2015, through Universal Studios Home Entertainment. The DVD includes a behind-the-scenes special, The Making of The Wiz Live! As part of Andrew Lloyd Webber's The Shows Must Go On, the full show was made available on YouTube for a limited time, to support the African-American community and other communities of color during the George Floyd protests.

See also
 2015 in American television

References

External links
 
 
 

2010s American television specials
2015 television specials
African-American films
American live television shows
English-language television shows
Films shot in New York (state)
Musical television films
Musical television specials
NBC television specials
Musicals based on The Wizard of Oz
Films directed by Kenny Leon